Dehshir-e Olya (also Romanized as Dehshīr-e ‘Olyā; also known as Ardh-i-Shīr, Deh-e Shīr-e Bālā, Dehshīr, Deh Shīr-e Bālā, Deshīr Bālā, Deshīr-e Bālā, Deshīr-e ‘Olyā, and Deyshir) is a village in Bughda Kandi Rural District, in the Central District of Zanjan County, Zanjan Province, Iran. At the 2006 census, its population was 797, in 182 families.

References 

Populated places in Zanjan County